Daniel Clérice (1912–1990) was a French film and stage actor.

Selected filmography
 Culprit (1937)
 Vidocq (1939)
 Bécassine (1940)
 Miquette (1940)
 Le roi des resquilleurs (1945)
 Without Trumpet or Drum (1950)
 Come Down, Someone Wants You (1951)
 Father Brown (1954)
 Crime au Concert Mayol (1954)
 Boulevard du crime (1955)
 Hospital de urgencia (1956)

References

Bibliography
 Bessy, Maurice. Histoire du cinéma français: 1956-1960. Pygmalion, 1986.

External links

1912 births
1990 deaths
French male film actors
French male stage actors
Male actors from Paris